Ryan Devon Steede (born 9 November 1975) is a Bermudian former cricketer. He played as a right-handed batsman and a right-arm fast-medium bowler. He played three One Day Internationals for Bermuda.

References
 

1975 births
Living people
Bermudian cricketers
Bermuda One Day International cricketers